Dorcus taurus is a species of beetle belonging to the family Lucanidae which was described by Johan Christian Fabricius in 1801.

Description
In males the head is large with large jaws. The head and the pronotum are dark brown, while elytra are clearer.

Distribution
Dorcus taurus can be found in Philippines, Indonesia and Malaysia .

Subspecies
Species and subspecies of the genus Serrognathus were recently reclassified and merged into the genus Dorcus as follows:

Dorcus taurus borneensis Hughes Bomans, 1993 – Borneo
Dorcus taurus cribriceps (Chevrolat, 1841) – Luzón, Negros, Mindoro and Mindanao
Dorcus taurus gypaetus (Laporte de Castelnau, 1840) – Java
Dorcus taurus jampeanus (Mizunuma in Mizunuma and Shinji Nagai, 1994) – Sulawesi
Dorcus taurus moinieri (Lacroix, 1983)
Dorcus taurus taurus (Fabricius, 1801) – Sumatra and Malay Peninsula

References

Lucaninae
Beetles of Asia
Insects of Indonesia
Beetles described in 1801
Taxa named by Johan Christian Fabricius